Ciénega de Zimatlán is a town and municipality in Oaxaca in south-western Mexico. The municipality covers an area of 25.52 km2. 
It is part of the Zimatlán District in the west of the Valles Centrales Region

As of 2005, the municipality had a total population of 2,562.

References

Municipalities of Oaxaca